Strip the City is a documentary science television series that aired on the Science Channel in 2012 and 2014. It explores the construction of major cities and the geology lying beneath them, with an emphasis on computer-generated imagery to "strip" away layers of structures and the rock of geological features to reveal their interiors.

Content
Strip the City uses computer-generated imagery (CGI) to "strip" major cities layer-by-layer of their steel, concrete, buildings, roads, rivers. and bedrock to reveal the technology and infrastructure that allowed their creation and keeps them functioning. CGI also peels back the layers of buildings to show they were constructed, strips away oceans to reveal sunken cities, and cuts into rock to display the inner workings of volcanoes, subterranean rivers, underground volcanoes and cliffs, fault lines, and ancient catacombs and describe their impact on life in the cities above them.

A later Science Channel series, Strip the Cosmos, built upon the CGI concepts introduced in Strip the City, employing them to reveal the interiors of astronomical objects.

Episode list

Season 1 (2012)
SOURCES Windfall Films Strip the City Series 1 Episode 1 Ancient City: Rome Accessed 2 November 2021Windfall Films Strip the City Series 1 Episode 3 Desert City: Dubai Accessed 2 November 2021Windfall Films Strip the City Series 1 Episode 5 Ice City: Toronto Accessed 2 November 2021

Season 2 (2014)
SOURCES Windfall Films Strip the City Series 2 Episode 1 Superstorm City: New York Accessed 3 November 2021Windfall Films Strip the City Series 2 Episode 3 Sinking City: Venice Accessed 3 November 2021Windfall Films Strip the City Series 2 Episode 5 Hurricane City: New Orleans Accessed 3 November 2021Windfall Films Strip the City Series 2 Episode 7 Inca Empire: Machu Picchu Accessed 3 November 2021

See also
Strip the Cosmos

References

External links
Windfall Films Strip the City

2012 American television series debuts
2014 American television series endings
2010s American documentary television series
Documentary television series about architecture
Documentary television series about science
Science Channel original programming